The 1972 Texas–Arlington Mavericks football team was an American football team that represented  the University of Texas at Arlington in the Southland Conference during the 1972 NCAA College Division football season. In their second year under head coach John Symank, the team compiled a 5–6 record.

Schedule

References

Texas–Arlington
Texas–Arlington Mavericks football seasons
Texas–Arlington Mavericks football